John Royce Mathis (born September 30, 1935) is an American singer of popular music. Starting his career with singles of standard music, he became highly popular as an album artist, with several dozen of his albums achieving gold or platinum status and 73 making the Billboard charts. Mathis has received the Grammy Lifetime Achievement Award and has been inducted into the Grammy Hall of Fame for three recordings.

Although frequently described as a romantic singer, his discography includes traditional pop, Brazilian and Spanish music, soul, rhythm and blues, show tunes, Tin Pan Alley, soft rock, blues, country music, and even a few disco songs for his album Mathis Magic in 1979. Mathis has also recorded six albums of Christmas music. In a 1968 interview, Mathis cited Lena Horne, Nat King Cole, and Bing Crosby among his musical influences.

Early life and education
Mathis was born in Gilmer, Texas on September 30, 1935, the fourth of seven children of Clem Mathis and Mildred Boyd, both domestic cooks. The family moved to San Francisco when Johnny was five years old, settling on 32nd Avenue in the Richmond District, where Mathis would grow up.

His father had worked in vaudeville as a singer and pianist, and upon realizing his son's talent, bought an old upright piano for $25 (US$ in  dollars) and encouraged his music. Mathis began learning songs and routines from his father; his parents also ran his fan club. His first song was "My Blue Heaven". Mathis started singing and dancing for visitors at home, at school, and at church functions.

When Mathis was 13, voice teacher Connie Cox accepted him as her student in exchange for work around her house. Mathis studied with Cox for six years, learning vocal scales and exercises, voice production, classical and operatic singing. The first band he sang with was formed by his high school friend Merl Saunders. Mathis eulogized Saunders at his funeral in 2008, thanking him for giving Mathis his first chance as a singer.

Mathis was a star athlete at George Washington High School in San Francisco. He was a high jumper and hurdler, and he played on the basketball team. In 1954, he enrolled at San Francisco State College on an athletic scholarship, intending to become an English teacher and a physical education teacher. He and future NBA star Bill Russell were featured in a 1954 sports section article of the San Francisco Chronicle demonstrating their high-jumping skills (Russell was #1 and Mathis was #2 in the city of San Francisco at that time).

Career

Early years
While singing at a Sunday afternoon jam session with a friend's jazz sextet at the Black Hawk Club in San Francisco, Mathis attracted the attention of the club's co-founder, Helen Noga. She became his music manager, and found Mathis a job singing weekends at Ann Dee's 440 Club. In September 1955, she learned that George Avakian, head of Popular Music A&R at Columbia Records, was on vacation near San Francisco. After repeated calls, Noga finally persuaded Avakian to come hear Mathis at the 440 Club. After hearing Mathis sing, Avakian sent his record company a telegram stating: "Have found phenomenal 19-year-old boy who could go all the way. Send blank contracts."

At San Francisco State, Mathis had become noteworthy as a high jumper, and in 1956 he was asked to try out for the U.S. Olympic Team that would travel to Melbourne that November. On his father's advice, Mathis opted to embark on a professional singing career.

Mathis's first record album, Johnny Mathis: A New Sound In Popular Song, was a slow-selling jazz album, but Mathis stayed in New York City to sing in nightclubs. His second album was produced by Columbia Records vice-president and record producer Mitch Miller, who helped to define the Mathis sound. Miller preferred that Mathis sing soft, romantic ballads, pairing him with conductor and music arranger Ray Conniff, and later, Ray Ellis, Glenn Osser, and Robert Mersey. In late 1956, Mathis recorded two of his most popular songs: "Wonderful! Wonderful!" and "It's Not for Me to Say". Also that year, Metro-Goldwyn-Mayer signed him up to sing the latter song in the movie Lizzie (1957).

Showbiz millionaire
Mathis' appearance on the popular TV program The Ed Sullivan Show in June 1957 helped increase his popularity. Later that year he released "Chances Are", which became his second single to sell a million copies. In November 1957, Mathis released "Wild Is the Wind", which featured in the film of the same name and was nominated for the Academy Award for Best Original Song. He performed the song at the ceremony in March 1958.

 The week before his appearance at the Academy Awards, Johnny's Greatest Hits was released. The album spent an unprecedented 490 consecutive weeks (nearly nine and one-half years) on the Billboard top 200 album charts, including three weeks at number one. It held the record for the most weeks on the top Billboard 200 albums in the US for 15 years, until Pink Floyd's The Dark Side of the Moon (March 1973) reached 491 weeks in October 1983.

Later in 1958, Mathis made his second film appearance for 20th Century Fox, singing the song "A Certain Smile" in the film of that title. The song was also nominated for the Academy Award for Best Original Song. By the end of the year, he was set to earn $1 million a year. Critics called him "the velvet voice". In 1962, Ebony magazine listed Mathis as one of 30-35 millionaires on their list of "America's 100 Richest Negroes". Mathis had two of his biggest hits in 1962 and 1963, with "Gina" (number 6) and "What Will Mary Say" (number 9).

Split from Noga
In October 1964, Mathis sued Noga to void their management arrangement, which Noga fought with a counterclaim in December 1964. After splitting from Noga, Mathis established Jon Mat Records, incorporated in California on May 11, 1967, to produce his recordings, and Rojon Productions, incorporated in California on September 30, 1964, to handle all of his concert, theater, showroom, and television appearances, and all promotional and charitable activities. (Previously, he founded Global Records to produce his Mercury albums.) His new manager and business partner was Ray Haughn, who, until his death in September 1984, helped guide Mathis's career.

Popularity plateau
While Mathis continued to make music, the ascent of the Beatles and early 1970s album rock kept his adult contemporary recordings out of the pop singles charts, until he experienced a career renaissance in the late 1970s. He had the 1976 Christmas number one single in the UK with the song "When a Child Is Born" and later, in 1978, recorded "Too Much, Too Little, Too Late" with singer Deniece Williams. The lyrics and music were arranged by Nat Kipner and John McIntyre Vallins. Released as a single in 1978, it reached number one on the U.S. Billboard Hot 100 pop chart, number nine on the Canadian Singles Chart and number three on the UK Singles Chart. It also topped the US R&B and adult contemporary charts. "Too Much, Too Little, Too Late" was certified gold and silver in the US and in the UK by the RIAA and the British Phonographic Industry, respectively. It was his first number one hit since his 1957 chart-topper "Chances Are".

The duo released a follow-up duet, their version of "You're All I Need to Get By," peaking at number 47 on the Billboard Hot 100. In 1983, they were credited with performing "Without Us", the theme song for the American television sitcom Family Ties, from its second season onwards. The success of the duets with Williams prompted Mathis to record duets with a variety of partners, including Dionne Warwick, Natalie Cole, Gladys Knight, Jane Olivor, Stephanie Lawrence, and Nana Mouskouri. A compilation album, also called Too Much, Too Little, Too Late, released by Sony Music in 1995, featured the title track among other songs by Mathis and Williams.

Recent years
During 1980–1981, Mathis recorded an album with Chic's Bernard Edwards and Nile Rodgers, I Love My Lady, which remained unreleased in its entirety until its 2017 appearance in the 68 disc collection The Voice of Romance: The Columbia Original Album Collection. Three tracks had appeared on a Chic box set in 2010 and a fourth, the title track, on Mathis' Ultimate Collection in 2011 and the Chic Organization's Up All Night in 2013.

Mathis returned to the British Top 30 album chart in 2007 with the Sony BMG release The Very Best of Johnny Mathis; in 2008 with the CD "A Night to Remember"; and again in 2011 with "The Ultimate Collection"

Mathis continues to perform live, but from 2000 forward, he limited his concert performances to about fifty to sixty per year. He is one of the last pop singers who travel with his own full orchestra (as opposed to a band).

On January 14, 2016, Mathis performed to a sold-out audience in The Villages as part of his "60th Anniversary Concert Tour".

Career achievements
Mathis, Bob Dylan, Barbra Streisand, Tony Bennett, Billy Joel, and Bruce Springsteen carry the distinction of having the longest tenure of any recording artists on the Columbia label. With the exception of a four-year break to record for Mercury Records in the mid-1960s, Mathis has been with Columbia Records throughout his career, from 1956 to 1963 and from 1968 to the present. (Dylan spent a couple of years at Asylum Records then re-signed with Columbia; Bennett recorded for Verve and his own Improv label from 1972 to 1986 when he returned to Columbia; Joel has been with the label since his 1973 album "Piano Man;" Streisand and Springsteen have never left.)

He has had five of his albums on the Billboard charts simultaneously, an achievement equaled by only three other singers: Frank Sinatra, Barry Manilow, and (posthumously) Prince. He has released 200 singles and had 71 songs charted around the world.

Other appearances
He has taped twelve of his own television specials and made over 300 television guest appearances, with 54 (Rojon Productions Archives) of them being on The Tonight Show. Longtime Tonight Show host Johnny Carson said, "Johnny Mathis is the best ballad singer in the world." He appeared on the show with Carson's successor, Jay Leno, on March 29, 2007, to sing "The Shadow of Your Smile" with the saxophonist Dave Koz. Through the years, his songs (or parts of them) have been heard in 100 plus television shows and films around the globe. His appearance on the Live by Request broadcast in May 1998 on the A&E Network had the largest television viewing audience of the series. Also in 1989, Johnny sang the theme for the ABC daytime soap opera Loving.

Mathis served as narrator for '51 Dons, a 2014 documentary film about the integrated and undefeated 1951 San Francisco Dons football team. The team was denied a chance to play in a bowl game because it refused to agree to not play its two African-American players, Ollie Matson and Burl Toler, who were childhood friends of Mathis.

Mathis appeared in the Season 14 finale of Criminal Minds, "Truth or Dare", in which he played himself as an old friend of David Rossi and served as best man at Rossi's wedding.

Personal life
Despite missing the Olympic high-jump trials, he retains enthusiasm for sports. He is an avid golfer, with nine holes in one to his credit. He has hosted several Johnny Mathis Golf Tournaments in the United Kingdom and the US. Since 1985, he has been hosting a charity golf tournament in Belfast sponsored by Shell corporation, and the annual Johnny Mathis Invitational Track & Field Meet has continued at San Francisco State University since it started in 1982. He also enjoys cooking and in 1982, he published a cookbook called Cooking for You Alone.

Mathis has undergone rehabilitation for both alcohol and prescription drug addictions, and he has supported many organizations through the years, including the American Cancer Society, the March of Dimes, the YWCA and YMCA, the Muscular Dystrophy Association and the NAACP.

He is a convert to Catholicism.

Mathis was quoted in a 1982 Us magazine article, stating: "Homosexuality is a way of life that I've grown accustomed to." Mathis later said that that comment was supposed to have been off the record and did not publicly discuss his sexual orientation for many years after that. In 2006, Mathis said that his silence had been because of death threats he received as a result of that 1982 article. On April 13, 2006, Mathis granted a podcast interview with The Strip in which he talked about the subject once again, and how some of his reluctance to speak on the subject was partially generational. During an interview with CBS News Sunday Morning on May 14, 2017, Mathis discussed the Us magazine article and confirmed he is gay. "I come from San Francisco. It's not unusual to be gay in San Francisco. I've had some girlfriends, some boyfriends, just like most people. But I never got married, for instance. I knew that I was gay." Mathis spoke to many news sources, including CBS, about his sexuality and his story about coming out.

In November 2015, Mathis returned home from a concert in Ohio to find his Hollywood house destroyed by a fire. He had owned it for 56 years.

On January 17, 2023,  a series of powerful storms drenched the hillside in front of the rebuilt Johnny Mathis home in Hollywood Hills, resulting in the collapse of the hillside, crushing a silver Jaguar with debris and mud. The hillside landslide cut off utilities to Mathis' hillside mansion, exposing water pipes and other infrastructure to the elements. The ground had given way in the 1400 block of Sunset Plaza during the storm, taking out landscaping and terrain next to the home. It remained unclear at the time of news reports exactly when Mathis, age 87 and still performing concerts, would be able to return and reoccupy his home, as the stability or instability of the home was not known in light of the surrounding terrain damage.

While the character Shy Baldwin from The Marvelous Mrs. Maisel is a composite character based on several different singers, Rachel Brosnahan said that she most strongly associated Mathis with the character.

Honors and awards

Grammys
In 2003, the Academy of Recording Arts and Sciences awarded Mathis the Lifetime Achievement Award. This Special Merit Award is presented by vote of the Recording Academy's National Trustees to performers who, during their lifetimes, have made creative contributions of outstanding artist significance to the field of recording.

Grammy Hall of Fame
Mathis has been inducted into the Grammy Hall of Fame for three separate recordings — in 1998 for "Chances Are", in 2002 for "Misty", and in 2008 for "It's Not for Me to Say".

Great American Songbook Hall of Fame
On June 21, 2014, Mathis was inducted into the Great American Songbook Hall Of Fame along with Linda Ronstadt, Shirley Jones, and Nat King Cole (whose daughter Natalie Cole accepted the award on his behalf). The awards were presented by the Center for the Performing Arts artistic director Michael Feinstein. Defined on their website, "Conceived as an enduring testament to the Great American Songbook, the Hall of Fame honors performers and composers responsible for creating America's soundtrack."

Other
In 1978, his hit duet "The Last Time I Felt Like This" from the film Same Time, Next Year was nominated for an Academy Award for Best Original Song. Mathis and Jane Olivor sang the song at the Academy Awards ceremony, in his second performance at the Oscars. His first occurred 20 years earlier in 1958, when he sang "Wild Is the Wind" by Dimitri Tiomkin and Ned Washington from the movie of the same name. He was also awarded the Society of Singers Lifetime Achievement Award in 2006. In 2007, Mathis was inducted into the Hit Parade Hall of Fame. In 1988, Mathis appeared as a guest vocalist, accompanied by Henry Mancini, on Late Night with David Letterman to sing Henry's theme to the "Viewer Mail" segment. In 2011, Mathis received the Golden Plate Award of the American Academy of Achievement presented by Awards Council member General Colin Powell.

In 2017, San Francisco State University awarded him an honorary Doctor of Fine Arts degree. Mathis attended San Francisco State for three semesters before withdrawing in 1956 to pursue his music career.

Discography

Bibliography

References

External links

 
 
 
Music Brainz – Johnny Mathis
 Johnny Mathis at Sony website
 [ Mathis, Johnny-AMG discography] — Allmusic
 Johnny Mathis Biography and Interview on American Academy of Achievement

1935 births
Living people
20th-century American LGBT people
20th-century American singers
21st-century American LGBT people
21st-century American singers
African-American basketball players
African-American Catholics
African-American golfers
African-American male singers
African-American male track and field athletes
American cookbook writers
American crooners
American gay musicians
American LGBT singers
American LGBT songwriters
American LGBT sportspeople
American male golfers
American male pop singers
American male singers
American men's basketball players
American people who self-identify as being of Native American descent
Ballad musicians
Basketball players from San Francisco
Basketball players from Texas
Columbia Records artists
Converts to Roman Catholicism
Fontana Records artists
Gay singers
Gay songwriters
Gay sportsmen
Golfers from San Francisco
Golfers from Texas
Grammy Lifetime Achievement Award winners
LGBT African Americans
LGBT basketball players
LGBT golfers
LGBT people from California
LGBT people from Texas
LGBT Roman Catholics
Mercury Records artists
People from Gilmer, Texas
People from Longview, Texas
San Francisco State Gators men's basketball players
San Francisco State University alumni
Singers from San Francisco
Singers from Texas
Track and field athletes from San Francisco
Track and field athletes from Texas
Traditional pop music singers